Stuart Robson may refer to:

 Stuart Robson (actor)
 Stuart Robson (speedway rider)

See also 
 Stewart Robson, former professional footballer